The speckled smooth-hound (Mustelus mento) is a houndshark of the family Triakidae. Collectively with certain other species of shark, it is known as "tollo".

Description
The speckled smooth-hound is a robust shark with a moderately long, blunt snout, small eyes, short mouth and molar-like teeth without cusps. The trailing edge of the dorsal fins have small, pointed projections. The pectoral fins are large and the pelvic fins moderately large. The caudal peduncle is short and the lower lobe of the tail fin is narrow and slightly curved. Adults are grey or greyish-brown above and paler below, liberally speckled with white spots. Juveniles have dark bars.

Distribution
The speckled smooth-hound is found off the Pacific coast of South America, including the Galapagos Islands and the Juan Fernández Islands. Its range extends from the Isla Lobos de Tierra in Peru to the southern tip of Chile. Reports of this fish occurring in the Atlantic Ocean off the coast of Argentina are thought to be erroneous, and are likely to refer to the narrownose smooth-hound (Mustelus schmitti), another shark that is speckled with white spots.

Biology
Litter sizes are typically seven.

Status
Along with the humpback smooth-hound (Mustelus whitneyi) and the spotted houndshark (Triakis maculata), this fish is known to local fisheries as "tollo" and is caught by artisan fishermen using gill nets. Landings in Chile peaked in 1989 at around 1300 tons but have since dwindled to less than 200 tons a year, with fish stocks declining and a transfer of the fisheries to targeting rays. The speckled smooth-hound is assessed by the IUCN as being "critically endangered".

References

speckled smooth-hound
Western South American coastal fauna
Fauna of Temperate South America
speckled smooth-hound